South Walls, often referred to as Walls, is an inhabited island adjacent to Hoy in Orkney, Scotland. The name is a corruption of "Sooth Was", which means the "southern voes" – as with Kirkwall, it was assumed that it was a mispronunciation of "walls".

South Walls forms the southern side of the harbour of Longhope. It was a tidal island until a narrow causeway, was constructed over the sandbank in 1912, which was known as the Ayre, although this name has become transferred to the causeway itself. Although sometimes considered to be a peninsula, it is an island in all but name.

South Walls is a popular stopping off place for barnacle geese.

Geography and geology

The island, like most of the Orkney archipelago, is made up of old red sandstone with the Rousay Flagstone Group predominating.

The island is more or less oval in shape, but there is a small promontory, called Cantick Head in the south east, which is created by Kirk Hope (Church Bay). It is separated from Hoy by an arm of the sea, also called Longhope. The area to the south of the causeway is known as Aith Hope.

The fact that neither the 2001 or 2011 censuses mention South Walls in their lists of inhabited islands suggests that there is some dubiety about its status as an island. (In 2001 the General Register Office for Scotland defined an island as "a mass of land surrounded by water, separate from the Scottish mainland" and although the inclusion of islands linked man-made constructions is not clear from this definition in practice they list several separately that are joined to one another by bridges and causeways). The evidence for its island status includes: 
 mentioned in Livingstone's comprehensive Scottish island tables;
 the Vision of Britain map of 1856 clearly shows a drying gap between the islands of Hoy and South Walls prior to the construction of the causeway across the Ayre;
 In Jo Ben's 1529 "Descriptions of Orkney", Wais appears in a list of islands but the wording states: "the island is not large. There is no distinction between Hoy and Wais, but it is one island from the firth receding". This last phrase could be interpreted to mean "at low tide";
 Irvine's reprint of Blaeu's Atlas Novus of 1654 contains various descriptions of Orkney including:-
 "the island of Walls, (commonly Waes);
 "among them Hoy Walls, whether this is two islands, or one: because about the season of equal day, when the tides goes out, they are joined with waves and sand at a narrow neck as one island; when the tide comes in and the sea is again interposed, the appearance of two lands surrounded by water is produced."

Although it is clear that the island is inhabited as it was not listed as such by the census no reliable estimate of the current total is available. Presumably the presence of the causeway linking South Walls to Hoy has resulted in the population of the former being included with the latter for statistical purposes.

History

Norse period

South Walls features fairly prominently in the Norse period, partly because it was the first landfall when sailing from west Caithness or Sutherland. The Orkneyinga saga mentions the island several times, such as in Chapter XCV:

"Early in the winter, Earl Erlend [Harald's Son] and Swein left Thórsá, and took their course by the west coast of Scotland. They had six long-ships, all well manned. They had to row, and when they had gone some distance from Caithness, Earl Rögnvald's spies went out to the islands, and told him the news. Then the Earls moved their ships to Skálpeid (Scapa), and Earl Rögnvald wished them to stay a while on board.

"When Swein and Erlend came west off Stour ["Ru Stoer in Assynt on the west coast of Sutherlandshire"], the former said that they should not distress themselves by rowing any further, and asked his men to put the ships about and set the sails. This action on the part of Swein was thought foolish, yet his men did as he desired them, when they had been sailing for a while the ships began to speed, because there was a fine breeze, and nothing is said of their voyage until they reached Vagaland (South Walls) in Orkney. There they heard the Earls were lying at Skálpeid, off Knarrarstaðir (Knarston) with thirteen ships... It was four nights before Simon's-mas when Swein, Asleif's Son decided to attack the earls during the night, but it was thought rather hazardous, as their followers were so much more numerous. Yet Swein insisted on having his own way, and so he did, because the Earl wished to follow his advice."

South Walls also played a crucial role in the Christianisation of Orkney. Although Christianity in the islands predated the Norse by a number of years, the Norse often remained pagan. Olaf Tryggvasson, King of Norway forced the Earl of Orkney, Sigurd Hloðvisson to be baptised at South Walls. Earl Sigurd accepted, and remained a nominal Christian the rest of his life. However, he did so under duress - King Olaf had many valas (Norse shamans) executed by being tied and left on a skerry at ebb. This was a long and terrible wait for death, and perhaps Earl Sigurd expected a similar fate.

Modern history
Overlooking Longhope in the north east is Hackness Martello Tower and Battery.   The tower, together with another on the north side at Crockness, was built in 1815 to protect British ships in the bay of Longhope against attack by American and French privateers, during the Napoleonic Wars, while they waited for a Royal Navy escort on their journey to Baltic ports. The towers were rearmed for World War I. There is a similar tower across the Bay in South East Hoy. Hackness Martello Tower and Battery is in the care of Historic Scotland.

Cantick Head is well known for its lighthouse designed and built by David and Thomas Stevenson and first lit in July 1858 and automated in 1991.

South Walls has substantial remains from the World War II period, when Scapa Flow was used as a Royal Navy base.

Nature reserve
The Hill of White Hamars hill farm is a Scottish Wildlife Trust nature reserve.

See also
 Ayre (landform)
 Geology of Orkney
 St Ninian's Isle in Shetland, connected to Mainland Shetland by a tombolo.
 Gugh one of the Isles of  Scilly connected to St Agnes by a tombolo.

Footnotes

References
 Irvine, James M. (ed.) (2006) The Orkneys and Schetland in Blaeu's Atlas Novus of 1654. Ashtead. James M. Irvine. 
 Omand, Donald (ed.) (2003) The Orkney Book. Edinburgh. Birlinn.

External links

Islands of the Orkney Islands
Hoy